The golden sand-eater (Lethrinops auritus) is a species of cichlid fish endemic to Lake Malawi where it prefers shallow waters with muddy substrates.  This species grows to a length of  TL.  It can also be found in the aquarium trade.

References

golden sand-eater
Taxa named by Charles Tate Regan
golden sand-eater
Taxonomy articles created by Polbot